The 2018 Canadian Mixed Doubles Curling Olympic Trials, also known as the Canad Inns Canadian Mixed Doubles Trials, were held from January 2 to 7 at the Stride Place in Portage la Prairie, Manitoba. The winners of this event  represented Canada at the 2018 Winter Olympics.

Teams
Teams qualified for these Olympic Trials by virtue of their results at the past two Canadian Mixed Doubles Curling Championships as well as their standing on the Canadian Mixed Doubles Rankings (CMDR). Members of Canada's Olympic four-player teams are not eligible to compete in the Canadian Mixed Doubles Trials because of the rigours of the Olympic curling schedule. If their teammate qualified for the Olympics as part of a four-player team, they must name a replacement to compete alongside them in the Trials.

The teams that qualified for the trials are listed as follows:

Round-robin standings
Final round-robin standings

Round-robin results
All draw times are listed in Central Time (UTC−6:00).

Draw 1
Tuesday, January 2, 8:00

Draw 2
Tuesday, January 2, 10:45

Draw 3
Tuesday, January 2, 13:30

Draw 4
Tuesday, January 2, 16:15

Draw 5
Tuesday, January 2, 19:00

Draw 6
Tuesday, January 2, 21:45

Draw 7
Wednesday, January 3, 8:00

Draw 8
Wednesday, January 3, 10:45

Draw 9
Wednesday, January 3, 13:30

Draw 10
Wednesday, January 3, 16:15

Draw 11
Wednesday, January 3, 19:00

Draw 12
Wednesday, January 3, 21:45

Draw 13
Thursday, January 4, 8:00

Draw 14
Thursday, January 4, 10:45

Draw 15
Thursday, January 4, 13:30

Draw 16
Thursday, January 4, 16:15

Draw 17
Thursday, January 4, 19:00

Draw 18
Thursday, January 4, 21:45

Tiebreaker
Friday, January 5, 08:30

Round of 8

A Bracket

A Semifinals
Friday, January 5, 15:00

A Finals
Friday, January 5, 19:00

B Bracket

B Semifinals
Friday, January 5, 19:00

B Finals
Saturday, January 6, 8:00

Page playoffs

1 vs. 2
Saturday, January 6, 15:00

3 vs. 4
Saturday, January 6, 12:00

Semifinal
Saturday, January 6, 19:00

Final
Sunday, January 7, 13:00

References

External links

Canadian Olympic Curling Trials
2018 in Canadian curling
Canadian 2018
January 2018 sports events in Canada
Curling at the 2018 Winter Olympics
Qualification tournaments for the 2018 Winter Olympics
Sport in Portage la Prairie
Curling in Manitoba
2018 in Manitoba